is a Japanese football player for Ventforet Kofu.

Club statistics
Updated to end of 2018 season.

Honours

Club
Ventforet Kofu
 Emperor's Cup: 2022

References

External links
Profile at Ventforet Kofu

1987 births
Living people
Fukuoka University alumni
Association football people from Ōita Prefecture
Japanese footballers
J1 League players
J2 League players
Gamba Osaka players
Avispa Fukuoka players
Ventforet Kofu players
Association football goalkeepers
Universiade bronze medalists for Japan
Universiade medalists in football
Medalists at the 2009 Summer Universiade